Jean-Baptiste Lully (born Giovanni Battista Lulli, ;  – 22 March 1687) was an Italian-born French composer, guitarist, violinist, and dancer who is considered a master of the French Baroque music style. Best known for his operas, he spent most of his life working in the court of Louis XIV of France and became a French subject in 1661. He was a close friend of the playwright Molière, with whom he collaborated on numerous comédie-ballets, including L'Amour médecin, George Dandin ou le Mari confondu, Monsieur de Pourceaugnac, Psyché and his best known work, Le Bourgeois gentilhomme.

Biography

Lully was born on November 28, 1632, in Florence, Grand Duchy of Tuscany, to Lorenzo Lulli and Caterina Del Sera, a Tuscan family of millers. His general education and his musical training during his youth in Florence remain uncertain, but his adult handwriting suggests that he manipulated a quill pen with ease. He used to say that a Franciscan friar gave him his first music lessons and taught him guitar. He also learned to play the violin. In 1646, dressed as Harlequin during Mardi Gras and amusing bystanders with his clowning and his violin, the boy attracted the attention of Roger de Lorraine, chevalier de Guise, son of Charles, Duke of Guise, who was returning to France and was looking for someone to converse in Italian with his niece, Mademoiselle de Montpensier (la Grande Mademoiselle). Guise took the boy to Paris, where the fourteen-year-old entered Mademoiselle's service; from 1647 to 1652 he served as her "chamber boy" (garçon de chambre). He probably honed his musical skills by working with Mademoiselle's household musicians and with composers Nicolas Métru, François Roberday and Nicolas Gigault. The teenager's talents as a guitarist, violinist, and dancer quickly won him the nicknames "Baptiste", and "le grand baladin" (great street-artist).

When Mademoiselle was exiled to the provinces in 1652 after the rebellion known as the Fronde, Lully "begged his leave ... because he did not want to live in the country." The princess granted his request.

By February 1653, Lully had attracted the attention of young Louis XIV, dancing with him in the Ballet royal de la nuit. By March 16, 1653, Lully had been made royal composer for instrumental music. His vocal and instrumental music for court ballets gradually made him indispensable. In 1660 and 1662 he collaborated on court performances of Francesco Cavalli's Xerse and Ercole amante. When Louis XIV took over the reins of government in 1661, he named Lully superintendent of the royal music and music master of the royal family. In December 1661, the Florentine was granted letters of naturalization. Thus, when he married Madeleine Lambert (1643–1720), the daughter of the renowned singer and composer Michel Lambert in 1662, Giovanni Battista Lulli declared himself to be "Jean-Baptiste Lully, escuyer [squire], son of Laurent de Lully, gentilhomme Florentin [Florentine gentleman]". The latter assertion was an untruth.

From 1661 on, the trios and dances he wrote for the court were promptly published. As early as 1653, Louis XIV made him director of his personal violin orchestra, known as the Petits Violons ("Little Violins"), which was proving to be open to Lully's innovations, as contrasted with the Twenty-Four Violins or Grands Violons ("Great Violins"), who only slowly were abandoning the polyphony and divisions of past decades. When he became surintendant de la musique de la chambre du roi in 1661, the Great Violins also came under Lully's control. He relied mainly on the Little Violins for court ballets.

Their collaboration began in earnest in 1664 with Le Mariage forcé. More collaborations followed, some of them conceived for fetes at the royal court, and others taking the form of incidental music (intermèdes) for plays performed at command performances at court and also in Molière's Parisian theater.

In 1672 Lully broke with Molière, who turned to Marc-Antoine Charpentier. Having acquired Pierre Perrin's opera privilege, Lully became the director of the Académie Royale de Musique, that is, the royal opera, which performed in the Palais-Royal. Between 1673 and 1687, he produced a new opera almost yearly and fiercely protected his monopoly over that new genre.

After Queen Marie-Thérèse's death in 1683 and the king's secret marriage to Mme de Maintenon, devotion came to the fore at court. The king's enthusiasm for opera dissipated; he was revolted by Lully's dissolute life and homosexual encounters. In 1686, to show his displeasure, Louis XIV made a point of not inviting Lully to perform Armide at Versailles.

Lully died from gangrene, having struck his foot with his long conducting staff during a performance of his Te Deum to celebrate Louis XIV's recovery from surgery. He refused to have his leg amputated so he could still dance. This resulted in gangrene propagating through his body and ultimately infecting the greater part of his brain, causing his death. He died in Paris and was buried in the church of Notre-Dame-des-Victoires, where his tomb with its marble bust can still be seen. All three of his sons (Louis Lully, Jean-Baptiste Lully fils, and Jean-Louis Lully) had musical careers as successive surintendants of the King's Music.

Lully himself was posthumously given a conspicuous place on Titon du Tillet's Parnasse François ("the French Mount Parnassus"). In the engraving, he stands to the left, on the lowest level, his right arm extended and holding a scroll of paper with which to beat time. (The bronze ensemble has survived and is part of the collections of the Museum of Versailles.) Titon honored Lully as:

Music, style and influence
Lully's music was written during the Middle Baroque period, 1650 to 1700. Typical of Baroque music is the use of the basso continuo as the driving force behind the music. The pitch standard for the French opera at the time was about 392 Hz for A above middle C, a whole tone lower than modern practice where A is usually 440 Hz.

Lully's music is known for its power, liveliness in its fast movements and its deep emotional character in its slower movements. Some of his most popular works are his  (passacaglias) and chaconnes, which are dance movements found in many of his works such as Armide or Phaëton.

The influence of Lully's music produced a radical revolution in the style of the dances of the court itself. In the place of the slow and stately movements which had prevailed until then, he introduced lively ballets of rapid rhythm, often based on well-known dance types such as gavottes, menuets, rigaudons and sarabandes.

Through his collaboration with playwright Molière, a new music form emerged during the 1660s: the comédie-ballet which combined theater, comedy, incidental music and ballet. The popularity of these plays, with their sometimes lavish special effects, and the success and publication of Lully's operas and its diffusion beyond the borders of France, played a crucial role in synthesizing, consolidating and disseminating orchestral organization, scorings, performance practices, and repertory.

The instruments in Lully's music were: five voices of strings such as dessus (a higher range than soprano), haute-contre (the instrumental equivalent of the high tenor voice by that name), taille (baritenor), quinte, and basse, divided as follows: one voice of violins, three voices of violas, one voice of cello, and basse de viole (viole, viola da gamba). He also utilized guitar, lute, archlute, theorbo, harpsichord, organ, oboe, bassoon, recorder, flute, brass instruments (natural trumpet) and various percussion instruments (castanets, timpani).

He is often credited with introducing new instruments into the orchestra, but this legend needs closer scrutiny. He continued to use recorders in preference to the newer transverse flute, and the "hautbois" he used in his orchestra were transitional instruments, somewhere between shawms and so-called Baroque oboes.

Lully created French-style opera as a musical genre (tragédie en musique or tragédie lyrique). Concluding that Italian-style opera was inappropriate for the French language, he and his librettist, Philippe Quinault, a respected playwright, employed the same poetics that dramatists used for verse tragedies: the 12-syllable "alexandrine" and the 10-syllable "heroic" poetic lines of the spoken theater were used for the recitative of Lully's operas and were perceived by their contemporaries as creating a very "natural" effect. Airs, especially if they were based on dances, were by contrast set to lines of less than 8 syllables. Lully also forsook the Italian method of dividing musical numbers into separate recitatives and arias, choosing instead to combine and intermingle the two, for dramatic effect. He and Quinault also opted for quicker story development, which was more to the taste of the French public.

William Christie has summarized the distribution of instruments in Lully's operas: "The orchestra is easier to reconstitute. In Lully's case, it is made up of strings, winds and sometimes brass. The strings, or the grand chœur written for five parts is distinct from the petit chœur, which is the continuo made up of a handful of players, following the formula inherited from the continuo operas of post-Monteverdian composers, Antonio Cesti and Francesco Cavalli. The continuo is a supple formula which minimizes the role of the orchestra, thus favoring the lute, the theorbo and the harpsichord. It therefore permits variation of color of the recitatives, which sometimes seem of excessive length."

Lully is credited with the invention in the 1650s of the French overture, a form used extensively in the Baroque and Classical eras, especially by Johann Sebastian Bach and George Frideric Handel.

Lully's works

Sacred music
Lully's grand motets were written for the royal chapel, usually for vespers or for the King's daily Low Mass. Lully did not invent the genre, he built upon it. Grand motets often were psalm settings, but for a time during the 1660s Lully used texts written by Pierre Perrin, a neo-Latin poet. Lully's petit motets were probably composed for the nuns at the convent of the Assumption, rue Saint-Honoré.

 [6] Motets à deux chœurs pour la Chapelle du roi, published 1684
 Miserere, at court, winter 1664
 Plaude laetare, text by Perrin, April 7, 1668
 Te Deum, at Fontainebleau, September 9, 1677
 De profundis, May 1683
 Dies irae, 1683
 Benedictus
 Domine salvum fac regem, grand motet
 Exaudiat te Dominus, grand motet, 1687
 Jubilate Deo, grand motet, 1660?
 Notus in Judea Deux, grand motet
 O lacrymae, grand motet, text by Perrin, at Versailles, 1664
 Quare fremuerunt, grand motet, at Versailles, April 19, 1685
 Petits motets: Anima Christi; Ave coeli manus, text by Perrin; Dixit Dominus; Domine salvum; Laudate pueri; O dulcissime Domine; Omnes gentes; O sapientia; Regina coeli; Salve regina

Ballets de cour
When Lully began dancing and composing for court ballets, the genre blossomed and markedly changed in character. At first, as composer of instrumental music for the King's chamber, Lully wrote overtures, dances, dance-like songs, descriptive instrumental pieces such as combats, and parody-like récits with Italian texts. He was so captivated by the French overture that he wrote four of them for the Ballet d'Alcidiane!

The development of his instrumental style can be discerned in his chaconnes. He experimented with all types of compositional devices and found new solutions that he later exploited to the full in his operas. For example, the chaconne that ends the Ballet de la Raillerie (1659) has 51 couplets plus an extra free part; in Le Bourgeois gentilhomme (1670) he added a vocal line to the chaconne for the Scaramouches.

The first menuets appear in the Ballet de la Raillerie (1659) and the Ballet de l'Impatience (1661). In Lully's ballets one can also see the emergence of concert music, for example, pieces for voice and instruments that could be excerpted and performed alone and that prefigure his operatic airs: "Bois, ruisseau, aimable verdure" from the Ballet des saisons (1661), the lament "Rochers, vous êtes sourds" and Orpheus's sarabande "Dieu des Enfers", from the Ballet de la naissance de Vénus (1665).

 Ballet du Temps, text by Benserade, at Louvre, November 30, 1654
 Ballet des plaisirs, text by Benserade, at Louvre, February 4, 1655
 Le Grand Ballet des Bienvenus, text by Benserade, at Compiègne, May 30, 1655
 Le Ballet de la Revente des habits, text by Benserade, at court, January 6, 1655 (or 1661?)
 Ballet of Psyché ou de la puissance de l'Amour, text by Benserade, at Louvre, January 16, 1656
 La Galanterie du temps, mascarade, anonymous text, February 14, 1656
 L'Amour malade, text by Buti, at Louvre, January 17, 1657
 Ballet royal d'Alcidiane, Benserade, at court, February 14, 1658
 Ballet de la Raillerie, text by Benserade, at court, February 19, 1659
 six ballet entrées serving as intermèdes to Cavalli's Xerse, at Louvre, November 22, 1660
 Ballet mascarade donné au roi à Toulouse, April 1660
 Ballet royal de l'impatience, text by Buti, at Louvre, February 19, 1661
 Ballet des Saisons, text by Benserade, at Fontainebleau, July 23, 1661
 ballet danced between the acts of Hercule amoureux, text by Buti, at Tuileries, February 7, 1662
 Ballet des Arts, text by Benserade, at Palais-Royal, January 8, 1663
 Les Noces du village, mascarade ridicule, text by Benserade, at Vincennes, October 3, 1663
 Les Amours déguisés, text by Périgny, at Palais-Royal, February 13, 1664
 incidental music between the acts of Oedipe, play by Pierre Corneille, Fontainebleau, August 3, 1664
 Mascarade du Capitaine ou l'Impromptu de Versailles, anonymous text, at Palais-Royal, 1664 or February 1665
 Ballet royal de la Naissance de Vénus, text by Benserade, at Palais-Royal, January 26, 1665
 Ballet des Gardes ou des Délices de la campagne, anonymous text, 1665
 Le Triomphe de Bacchus, mascarade, anonymous text, at court, January 9, 1666
 Ballet des Muses, Benserade, at St-Germain-en-Laye, 1666
 Le Carneval, mascarade, text by Benserade, at Louvre, January 18, 1668
 Ballet royal de Flore, text by Benserade, at Tuileries, February 13, 1669
 Le Triomphe de l'Amour, text by Benserade and Quinault, at St-Germain-en-Laye, December 2, 1681
 Le Temple de la Paix, text by Quinault, at Fontainebleau, October 20, 1685

Music for the theater (intermèdes)
"Also, to avoid breaking the thread of the piece by these interludes, it was deemed advisable to weave the ballet in the best manner one could into the subject, and make but one thing of it and the play." The music for the premiere of Les Fâcheux was composed by Pierre Beauchamp, but Lully later provided a sung courante for act 1, scene 3. Lully's intermèdes reached their apogee in 1670–1671, with the elaborate incidental music he composed for Le Bourgeois gentilhomme and Psyché. After his break with Molière, Lully turned to opera; but he collaborated with Jean Racine for a fete at Sceaux in 1685, and with Campistron for an entertainment at Anet in 1686.

Most of Molière's plays were first performed for the royal court.

 Les Fâcheux, play by Molière, at Vaux-le-Vicomte, August 17, 1661
 Le Mariage forcé, ballet, play by Molière, at Louvre, January 29, 1664
 Les Plaisirs de l'Ile enchantée, play by Molière, at Versailles, May 7–12, 1664
 L'Amour médecin, comédie-ballet, play by Molière, at Versailles, September 14, 1665
 La Pastorale comique, play by Molière, at St-Germain-en-Laye, January 5, 1667
 Le Sicilien, play by Molière, at St-Germain-en-Laye, February 14, 1667
 Le Grand Divertissement royal de Versailles (Georges Dandin), play by Molière, at Versailles, August 18, 1668
 La Grotte de Versailles, eclogue in music, play by Quinault, April (?) 1668
 Le Divertissement de Chambord (Monsieur de Pourceaugnac), play by Molière, at Chambord, October 6, 1669
 Le Divertissement royal (Les Amants magifiques), play by Molière, at St-Germain-en-Laye, February 7, 1670
 Le Bourgeois gentilhomme, comédie-ballet, play by Molière, at Chambord, October 14, 1670
 Psyché, tragi-comedy, Molière, play by Pierre Corneille and Quinault, at the Théâtre des Tuileries, January 17, 1671
 Les Fêtes de l'Amour et de Bacchus, pastoral, text by Quinault, Molière and Périgny, at the Salle du Bel-Air, a converted tennis court (jeu de paume), November 15 (?), 1672
 Idylle sur la Paix, text by Racine, at Sceaux, July 16, 1685
 Acis et Galatée, pastoral, text by Campistron, chateau of Anet, September 6, 1686

Operas

With five exceptions, each of Lully's operas was described as a tragédie mise en musique, or tragedy set to music. The exceptions were: Bellérophon, Cadmus et Hermione, and Psyché, each called simply a tragédie; and Les fêtes de l'Amour et de Bacchus, described as a pastorale, and Acis et Galathée, which is a pastorale héroïque. (The term tragédie lyrique came later.)

Always with Lully, the point of departure was a verse libretto, in most cases by the verse dramatist Philippe Quinault. For the dance pieces, Lully would hammer out rough chords and a melody on the keyboard, and Quinault would invent words. For the recitative, Lully imitated the speech melodies and dramatic emphasis used by the best actors in the spoken theater. His attentiveness to transferring theatrical recitation to sung music shaped French opera and song for a century.

Unlike Italian opera of the day, which was rapidly moving toward opera seria with its alternating recitative and da capo airs, in Lully's operas the focus was on drama, expressed by a variety of vocal forms: monologs, airs for two or three voices, rondeaux and French-style da capo airs where the chorus alternates with singers, sung dances, and vaudeville songs for a few secondary characters. In like manner the chorus performed in several combinations: the entire chorus, the chorus singing as duos, trios or quartets, the dramatic chorus, the dancing chorus.

The intrigue of the plot culminated in a vast tableau, for example, the sleep scene in Atys, the village wedding in Roland, or the funeral in Alceste. Soloists, chorus and dancers participated in this display, producing astonishing effects thanks to machinery. In contrast to Italian opera, the various instrumental genres were present to enrich the overall effect: French overture, dance airs, rondeaux, marches, "simphonies" that painted pictures, preludes, ritournelles. Collected into instrumental suites or transformed into trios, these pieces had enormous influence and affected instrumental music across Europe.

The earliest operas were performed at the indoor Bel Air tennis court (on the grounds of the Luxembourg Palace) that Lully had converted into a theater. The first performance of later operas either took place at court, or in the theater at the Palais-Royal, which had been made available to Lully's Academy. Once premiered at court, operas were performed for the public at the Palais-Royal.
 Cadmus et Hermione, tragedy by Quinault, at tennis court (jeu de paume) of Bel-Air, April 27 (?), 1673
 Alceste ou le Triomphe d'Alcide, tragedy by Quinault, at tennis court (jeu de paume) of Bel-Air, January 19, 1674
 Thésée, tragedy by Quinault, at St-Germain-en-Laye, January 11, 1675
 Atys, tragedy by Quinault, at St-Germain-en-Laye, January 10, 1676
 Isis, tragedy by Quinault ornamented by ballet entrées, at St-Germain-en-Laye, January 5, 1677
 Psyché, tragedy by Quinault, Thomas Corneille and Fontanelle, at Palais-Royal, April 19, 1678
 Bellérophon, tragedy by Thomas Corneille, Fontenelle and Boileau, at Palais-Royal, January 31, 1679
 Proserpine, tragedy by Quinault ornamented with ballet entrées, at St-Germain-en-Laye, February 3, 1680
 Persée, tragedy by Quinault, at Palais-Royal, April 18, 1682
 Phaëton, tragedy by Quinault, at Versailles, January 6, 1683
 Amadis, tragedy by Quinault, at Palais-Royal, January 18, 1684
 Roland, tragedy by Quinault, at Versailles (Grande Écurie), January 8, 1685
 Armide, tragedy by Quinault, 1686
 Achille et Polyxène, tragedy by Campistron, completed by Colasse, at Palais-Royal, November 7 (or 23), 1687

Depictions in fiction
 Henry Prunières's 1929 novel La Vie illustre et libertine de Jean-Baptiste Lully (Paris: Plon) was the first 20th-century novel about Lully that raised supposed questions about the composer's "moral character."
 Gérard Corbiau's 2000 film Le Roi danse (The King is dancing) presents libertine and pagan Lully as a natural ally of Louis XIV in the King's conflicts with the Catholic establishment. The movie depicts Lully with a concealed romantic interest in the King.
 In 2011 the BBC's hit children's show Horrible Histories featured the death of Lully in the skit "Stupid Deaths" in a live show at the Prom.
 Michel Poulette's 2015 film Swept Under featured his "Marche pour la Cérémonie des Turcs" as well as his life history in connection with a serial killer who leaves copies of his CDs at the crime scene.
 The 2022 film Tár, written and directed by Todd Field, mentions Jean-Baptiste Lully and his circumstances of his death.

Notes

Sources

Further reading
 Couvreur, Manuel. Jean-Baptiste Lully, Musique et dramaturgie au service du prince (Brussels: Marc Voker, 1992).
 
 
 
 La Gorce, Jérôme de. L'Opéra à Paris au temps de Louis XIV, histoire d'un théâtre (Paris: Desjonquères, 1992).
 Norman, Buford, Touched by the Graces, the Libretti of Philippe Quinault in the Context of French Classicism (Birmingham, AL: Summa, 2001).
 
 Schneider, Herbert. "Lully (les)", in Marcelle Benoit, ed., Dictionnaire de la musique en France au XVIIe et XVIIIe siècles (Paris: Fayard, 1992), pp. 414–419.

External links

 
 
 
 Jean-Baptiste Lully Collection at the University of North Texas

1632 births
1687 deaths
17th-century French composers
17th-century Italian musicians
17th-century LGBT people
Musicians from Florence
French ballet composers
French Baroque composers
French male composers
French opera composers
Italian classical composers
Italian emigrants to France
Italian opera composers
Bisexual men
Bisexual musicians
LGBT classical composers
French LGBT musicians
Italian LGBT musicians
Male opera composers
Opera managers
Directors of the Paris Opera
Deaths from gangrene
17th-century male musicians
Conductors (music) who died while conducting